The Colorado Street Bridge is a historic concrete arch bridge spanning the Arroyo Seco in Pasadena, California.

History
The Colorado Street Bridge was designed and built in 1912 at a total cost of $191,000. The bridge was designed by the firm of Waddell & Harrington, based in Kansas City, Missouri. The structure carries Colorado Boulevard (then called "Colorado Street"), the major east–west thoroughfare connecting Pasadena with Eagle Rock and Glendale to the west, and with Monrovia to the east. The Colorado Street Bridge replaced the small Scoville Bridge located near the bottom of the Arroyo Seco. It opened on December 13, 1913.

The bridge follows a curved path so that the footings would sit on more solid ground than a straight bridge would have provided. The bridge is on the National Register of Historic Places and has been designated a California Historic Civil Engineering Landmark by the American Society of Civil Engineers.

"Suicide Bridge"

During the early part of the 20th century, the Colorado Street Bridge became known locally as "Suicide Bridge" after dozens of people leaped to their deaths.  The bridge had a bad reputation before it was even built, as a construction worker fell to his death and landed in the wet cement under the bridge.

The number of deaths spiked during the Great Depression, but did not stop there. One of the most popular stories was about a woman and her child. One night, the mother took her child and herself to the bridge and was ready to end her life.  She threw her baby first and then jumped, plummeting to her death. The child survived, as it landed in a tree unharmed, but the mother successfully ended her life.

The balustrade was replaced by an  barrier in an effort to deter suicides. Still, on October 27, 2015, British-American model and reality television star Sam Sarpong leapt to his death.

In 2016 a  chain link fence was installed on the sidewalk inside the balustrade, blocking the seating alcoves which were believed to be the primary route taken by jumpers. In 2017, there were nine deaths. In 2018, there were four by September. After police spent 13 hours successfully negotiating with a would-be jumper, these temporary barrier fences were extended to cover the entire bridge span. The city plans to replace the temporary fencing with permanent barriers, at least  in height.

In culture
One of the earliest films in which the bridge appears is in Charlie Chaplin's The Kid (filmed 1919–1920), when a mother is shown at the east end of the bridge pining for her son at about the 12-minute mark. In 1989, after the Loma Prieta earthquake in Northern California, the bridge was declared a seismic hazard and closed to traffic. It was reopened in 1993 after a substantial retrofit. The bridge is closed each summer for a festival, A Celebration on the Colorado Street Bridge, hosted by historic preservation group Pasadena Heritage.

An episode from the eighth season of the series Full House, "Leap of Faith", featured the bridge in a bungee jumping scene. The bridge was depicted as being in the San Francisco Bay Area.

The bridge is featured in an episode of Fear Factor. The stunt, named "Bridge Hang", required contestants to hang from a trapeze bar hoisted over the edge of the bridge for as long as they could to avoid being eliminated. Host Joe Rogan does not refer to the bridge by name; rather, he says “This bridge used to be known as Suicide Bridge. Don’t worry, we’re not gonna ask you to jump off of it. Instead, we’re gonna ask you to hang on for dear life.”

The 2012 Lana Del Rey song "Summertime Sadness" for the album Born To Die filmed parts of its music video on the bridge. Actress Jaime King is seen climbing over a section of the bridge and then jumping off later in the video.

The bridge was the site of the beginning of The Amazing Race season 21.  The contestants had to rappel down the side of the bridge to their waiting cars to start the race.

In the 2016 romantic musical film La La Land, the protagonists took an evening stroll across the bridge.

In the 2008 film Yes Man, the bridge was featured in a scene where actor Jim Carrey attempts a bungee jump.

The bridge can often be seen during the road tests for vehicles on the popular YouTube series Jay Leno's Garage.

Gallery

See also
List of bridges documented by the Historic American Engineering Record in California

References

External links

City of Pasadena's History Page, with a historic postcard view of the bridge.
Colorado Street Bridge Pasadena, California, National Park Service
History of the Colorado Street Bridge from Pasadena Heritage

Bridges in Los Angeles County, California
Buildings and structures in Pasadena, California
Arroyo Seco (Los Angeles County)
Concrete bridges in California
Bridges completed in 1913
Bridges on U.S. Route 66
Road bridges on the National Register of Historic Places in California
Buildings and structures on the National Register of Historic Places in Pasadena, California
Historic American Engineering Record in California
1913 establishments in California
Open-spandrel deck arch bridges in the United States